NMMC is one of the largest Uzbek companies involved in the mining industry being among the top ten largest uranium and gold producers in the world. The most important ore deposits of the company are located in the Kyzyl Kum Desert.

The company announced its intention to Eurobond in 2022 and IPO internationally shortly thereafter.

Divisions

Northern Mining Administration (NMA)
NMA was founded in 1958 in Uchkuduk for uranium\ mining in open pits and in underground mines on the base of Uchkuduk Deposit.

Currently NMA's main activities are as follows: 
 in-situ Leaching uranium mining and processing;
 mining and processing of gold ore of Kokpatas Deposit;
 sulphuric acid production;
 marble goods manufacture on the base of "Novy" mine.
 
Chief of NMA is Shamin Vladimir Yurievich.

Central Mining Administration (CMA)
CMA was founded in 1964 in Zarafshan for development of Muruntau Mine - unique gold ore Deposit. Gold mining and processing facilities were constructed on its base.
Since March 1967 CMA has been mining gold in open pit, fulfilling the complete set of works – from prospecting and exploration till gold bars manufacture.

Gold and silver produced by CMA's Hydrometallurgical Plant #2 conform to the International Standards.

CMA's main activities: 
 gold mining in Muruntau open pit;
 gold ore processing at Hydrometallurgical Plant #2 and waste dump formation;
 improvement of technologies for development of Muruntau open pit;
 evaluation of mineral reserves increase and perspectives of further development of mineral base.

Southern Mining Administration (SMA)
SMA is located in Nurabod, Samarqand Region. It was founded in January 1964 for development of "Sabirsay" uranium deposit.

SMA's main activities: 
 uranium mining;
 development of Zarmitan and Marjanbulak gold ore deposits;
 marble mining and manufacture of polished facing tile;
 production of polyvinylchloride and polyethylene pipes of various diameters;
 consumer goods production and so on.

Chief of SMA is Akopyan Yuri Mikhailovich.

Mining Administration #5 (MA #5)
MA #5 is located in Zafarabad, Bukhara Province. It was founded in February 1971 as a subdivision of Leninabad Mining Chemical Complex for commercial development of "Bukinay" group of uranium deposits.

In 1993 MA #5 was included into NMMC's structure as its subdivision. Main activity is uranium mining by In-Situ Leaching Method.

Mining Administration #2 (MA #2)
MA #2 is located in Krasnogorsk, Parkent Region, Tashkent Province. It was founded in 1954 as a mining complex for commercial development of "Chauly" uranium deposit. Then MA #2 developed "Agata-Chibargata", "Naugisken" fluorite deposits. In 1963 MA #2 included Chibargata Mine and enrichment factory into its structure. In 1992 MA #2 became an associated member of "Kyzylkumredmetzoloto" State Concern and in 1995 it was included into NMMC's structure.

MA #2's main activities: 
 commercial mining of gabbro, facing stone;
 enrichment factory processes phosphorite ore and produces phosphorite concentrate.

As of December 2008 this unit is unprofitable.

Navoi Machine-Building Plant Production Association
It was founded in 1963 as a maintenance shop for the purposes of repair of NMMC's equipment.

NMBP is quite large unit which produces all kinds of castings; provides NMMC with spare parts, pumps, metal constructions, liner, outdoor equipment; produces wood-working machines and metal-removal machine tools, welding electrodes, consumer goods (washing machines, kitchen machines). This unit is significant in the republic as having facilities for repair of complex equipment used outside of NMMC.

Dense Leaching Workshop (formerly Zarafshan-Newmont Joint Venture)
"Zarafshan-Newmont" was Uzbek-American joint venture that had been put into operation in May 1995 for processing of sub-economic and low grade gold ore of Muruntau Deposit. "Zarafshan-Newmont" JV is a plant using heap leaching technology not previously applied in CIS countries.

"Zarafshan-Newmont" JV was constructed owing to use of foreign investment and technology. It is the first successfully realized large foreign investment in the Republic of Uzbekistan. This joint venture is closed now. All machines and production lane moved to NMMC (CMA).

Newmont doesn't have share in this JV anymore. At the moment it's a property of NMMC under the name of "Dense Leaching Workshop."

Zarispark Jewelry Plant
Located in Zarafshan. It was founded as "Zarispark" Uzbek-American joint venture. In 1996 NMMC bought the share of American partner and the JV was renamed as "Jewelry Plant". The main activity is jewelry manufacture. As of December 2008 this unit is unprofitable.

Agama Knitting Firm
Was founded on April 12, 1990 as a joint venture for consumer goods production and marketing.

Since 1997 "Agama" is NMMC's subdivision, state firm producing knitted goods. 
The first stage Spinning and Weaving Mill was constructed in Zarafshan. Manufacture of a new kind of cotton – acryl yarn was commenced there.

As of December 2008 this unit is highly unprofitable and awaiting authorities' decision to be put up to auction.

Zarafshan Construction Administration (ZCA)
Founded in 1967 carries out industrial and civil construction, building of automobile roads and railways.

Kyzylkum Phosphorite Plant
Founded in 1998 with annual capacity of 300,000 tons of phosphorite flour.

References

External links
Official site
http://www.wise-uranium.org - World Information Service on Energy

Uranium mining companies of Uzbekistan
Mining companies of Uzbekistan
Gold mining companies
Mining companies of the Soviet Union